The 1968 World 600, the ninth running of the event, was a NASCAR Grand National Series event that took place on May 26, 1968, at Charlotte Motor Speedway in Concord, North Carolina.

Background
Charlotte Motor Speedway, a  quad-oval track located in Concord, North Carolina, was the location for the race. The track's turns were banked at twenty-four degrees, while the front stretch, the location of the finish line, was five degrees. The back stretch, opposite of the front, also had a five degree banking. During the 1968 season, Charlotte Motor Speedway hosted the NASCAR Grand National Series twice, with the other race being the National 500.

Designed and built by Bruton Smith and partner and driver Curtis Turner in 1959, the first World 600 NASCAR race was held at the  speedway on June 19, 1960. On December 8, 1961, the speedway filed bankruptcy notice.  Judge J.B. Craven of US District Court for Western North Carolina reorganized it under Chapter 10 of the Bankruptcy Act; Judge Craven appointed Robert "Red" Robinson as the track's trustee until March 1962.  At that point, a committee of major stockholders in the speedway was assembled, headed by A.C. Goines and furniture store owner Richard Howard.   Goines, Howard, and Robinson worked to secure loans and other monies to keep the speedway afloat.

By April 1963 some $750,000 was paid to twenty secured creditors and the track emerged from bankruptcy; Judge Craven appointed Goines as speedway president and Howard as assistant general manager of the speedway, handling its day-to-day operations.  By 1964 Howard become the track's general manager, and on June 1, 1967, the speedway's mortgage was paid in full; a public burning of the mortgage was held at the speedway two weeks later.

Smith departed from the speedway in 1962 to pursue other business interests, primarily in banking and auto dealerships from his new home of Rockford, IL. He became quite successful and began buying out shares of stock in the speedway.  By 1974 Smith was more heavily involved in the speedway, to where Richard Howard by 1975 stated, "I haven't been running the speedway.  It's being run from Illinois." In 1975  Smith had become the majority stockholder, regaining control of its day-to-day operations. Smith hired H.A. "Humpy" Wheeler as general manager in October 1975, and on January 29, 1976, Richard Howard resigned as president and GM of the speedway.

Qualifying

Race report
This race was shortened to 255 laps due to rain after being able to race for three hours and four minutes in front of 60,000 people. Rain had started to appear much earlier in the race but flagman Johnny Bruner would not wave the caution flag until the conditions got dangerous. Throughout the day, 0.32 inches of rain were reported around Charlotte Motor Speedway.

Buddy Baker would defeat Donnie Allison under the race's sixth and final caution flag. Cale Yarborough would become the last-place finisher due to a crash on lap 45. All the competitors (except for Canadian Frog Fagan) was born in the United States of America. Bobby Allison suffered an engine problem on the 229th lap of the race; forcing him to retire in 28th place. Donnie Allison won the pole position at  during qualifying runs while actual race speeds would reach . Both of Nord Krauskopf's teams would finish in the "top ten" during this race. The top ten finishers included Buddy Baker, Donny Allison, LeeRoy Yarbrough, David Pearson, Bobby Isaac, Charlie Glotzbach, Tiny Lund, James Hylton, Curtis Turner, and Sam McQuagg.

Darel Dieringer would be a part of the race's second crash on lap 212; giving him a 32nd-place finish. Earl Balmer, Paul Lewis, and Phil Wendt would retire from NASCAR after this racing event. Prior to this race, Balmer was known as the winner of the 1966 Daytona 500 qualifying race.

Notable crew chiefs for this race included Junior Johnson, Harry Hyde, Dale Inman, Banjo Matthews and Bud Moore.

Timeline
Section reference: 
 Start of race: Cale Yarborough officially started the race with the pole position.
 Lap 45: Cale Yarborough had a terminal crash, forcing him to retire from the race.
 Lap 48: Jerry Grant took over the lead from Cale Yarborough.
 Lap 49: Donnie Allison took over the lead from Jerry Grant.
 Lap 56: A troublesome valve forced G.C. Spencer off the track.
 Lap 59: Earl Balmer could not handle his vehicle, causing him to exit the race.
 Lap 70: LeeRoy Yarborough took over the lead from Donnie Allison.
 Lap 91: Paul Goldsmith fell out with engine failure while racing at reasonably fast speeds.
 Lap 101: Buddy Baker took over the lead from LeeRoy Yarborough.
 Lap 143: LeeRoy Yarborough took over the lead from Buddy Baker.
 Lap 153: An oil leak in Bob Cooper's car forced him to stop racing for the day, Donnie Allison took over the lead from LeeRoy Yarbrough.
 Lap 154: Richard Petty took over the lead from Donnie Allison.
 Lap 155: Bud Moore took over the lead from Richard Petty.
 Lap 161: Buddy Baker took over the lead from Bud Moore.
 Lap 163: Bud Moore took over the lead from Buddy Baker.
 Lap 181: Buddy Baker took over the lead from Bud Moore.
 Lap 182: Transmission problems forced Bud Moore to abandon the race.
 Lap 186: A fault ignition ended Richard Petty's hopes of the winning the race.
 Lap 190: Transmission issues managed to knock out Sonny Hutchins from the race.
 Lap 205: Bobby Allison took over the lead from Buddy Baker.
 Lap 212: Darel Dieringer had a terminal crash, forcing him to retire from the race.
 Lap 218: LeeRoy Yarbrough took over the lead from Bobby Allison.
 Lap 226: Buddy Baker took over the lead from LeeRoy Yarborough.
 Lap 229: Buddy Allison fell out with engine failure while racing at reasonably fast speeds.
 Finish: Buddy Baker was officially declared the winner of the event.

References

World 600
World 600
NASCAR races at Charlotte Motor Speedway